Volume Two is the second LP album by The Soft Machine, released in 1969. The album combined humour, dada, psychedelia and jazz.

In 2000 it was voted number 715 in Colin Larkin's All Time Top 1000 Albums.

Overview
In the lyrics to "Have You Ever Bean Green?" Soft Machine thanks the Jimi Hendrix Experience, with whom they had just toured through the United States in 1968; as Hendrix's opening band they were exposed to large crowds for the first time. The title of this song is a play on the chorus lyric in the Hendrix song "Are You Experienced?", "Have you ever been experienced?". Wyatt thanks "Brian" (Brian Hopper) and "George" (engineer George Chkiantz) in the next section, Pataphysical Introduction – Pt. 2, which also includes a quote of "These Foolish Things." The title of the closing suite, "Esther's Nose Job", is derived from a chapter in Thomas Pynchon's novel V.

Track listing

Side 1
"Rivmic Melodies" – 17:07
"Pataphysical Introduction – Pt. 1" (Robert Wyatt) – 1:00
"A Concise British Alphabet – Pt. 1" (Hugh Hopper, arr. Wyatt) – 0:10
"Hibou, Anemone and Bear" (Mike Ratledge, Wyatt) – 5:58
"A Concise British Alphabet – Pt. 2" (Hopper, arr. Wyatt) – 0:12
"Hulloder" (Hopper, arr. Wyatt) – 0:52
"Dada Was Here" (Hopper, arr. Wyatt) – 3:25
"Thank You Pierrot Lunaire" (Hopper, arr. Wyatt) – 0:47
"Have You Ever Bean Green?" (Hopper, arr. Wyatt) – 1:23
"Pataphysical Introduction – Pt. 2" (Wyatt) – 0:50
"Out of Tunes" (Ratledge, Hopper, Wyatt) – 2:30

Side 2
"As Long as He Lies Perfectly Still" (Ratledge, Wyatt) – 2:30
"Dedicated to You But You Weren't Listening" (Hopper) – 2:30
"Esther's Nose Job" – 11:13
"Fire Engine Passing with Bells Clanging" (Ratledge) – 1:50
"Pig" (Ratledge) – 2:08
"Orange Skin Food" (Ratledge) – 1:52
"A Door Opens and Closes" (Ratledge) – 1:09
"10:30 Returns to the Bedroom" (Ratledge, Hopper, Wyatt) – 4:14

Personnel
Soft Machine
Mike Ratledge – piano, Lowrey Holiday De Luxe organ; Hammond organ (on 3); harpsichord (on 12); flute (on 3 and 10)
Hugh Hopper – bass guitar; acoustic guitar (on 12); alto saxophone (on 3 and 14-16)
Robert Wyatt – drums, lead and backing vocals

Additional personnel
Brian Hopper – soprano and tenor saxophone

References

External links
 The Soft Machine - Volume Two (1969) album review by Peter Kurtz, credits & releases at AllMusic
 The Soft Machine - Volume Two (1969) album releases & credits at Discogs
 Soft Machine discography at Calyx website

Soft Machine albums
1969 albums
Probe Records albums